Yeoford railway station is a rural station serving the village of Yeoford in Devon, England.

History 

The station was opened by the North Devon Railway in July 1857. To carry this extra traffic the line was doubled from Crediton to Yeoford on 1 June 1876 and onwards to a new Coleford Junction on 16 May 1877. The platform for trains going towards Plymouth and Barnstaple was given an extra track so trains could stand on both sides.

There were sidings on both sides of the station but in 1943 additional long sidings were laid at the Crediton end south of the Plymouth platform so that traffic could be exchanged between the two routes. The goods yard was closed on 10 February 1964 and the signal box closed on 18 August 1968. Through trains beyond  to Plymouth had been withdrawn in May 1968 and passenger services to Okeheampton ceased in 1972.

Coleford Junction was closed on 17 October 1971, since when the two lines at Yeoford have been operated as individual lines from Crediton to Barnstaple and to the quarry at Meldon near Okehampton. The Dartmoor Railway had planned to reopen the disused platform at Yeoford in order to create an interchange with the Tarka Line (and thus the national network). Through running from Yeoford to Okehampton was intended to commence in 2009 but this failed to happen. Daily passenger trains have since been restored between Exeter and Okehampton (now known as the Dartmoor line) but they cannot call at Yeoford as the platform on that line is derelict. The Tarka Line trains use what used to be the southbound platform in both directions.

The station has been used by many operators, but recently, over the last decade by Wales & West, a regional West Country and south Wales train operator, which in 2001 divided into Wessex Trains and Wales & Borders. Since then, Yeoford has been served by Wessex Trains and more recently by the Greater Western franchise, owned and operated by FirstGroup and now known as Great Western Railway.

Description
The station is on the northern edge of the Yeoford. The original buildings have all been demolished but there is a waiting shelter on the platform. The former station master's house is in residential use.

Services 
All services at Yeoford are operated by Great Western Railway.

Signalling
The signal box at Yeoford was opened on 1 June 1876. It was situated on the west side of the road bridge alongside the line to Coleford Junction. It had a wooden upper storey on top of an unusually tall stone base which was necessary so that the signaller could see over the bridge to the station and goods yard. It was closed on 18 August 1968.

Coleford Junction
To create a double-track route in 1877 the Okehampton line became the down line and the Barnstaple line became the up. This required a proper junction at Penstone which was called Coleford Junction. A signal box was opened here on 16 May 1877. It was closed on 17 October 1971 when the physical junction was moved to Crediton.

Neopardy
Trains shunting at Yeoford blocked the busy line from Crediton so an additional signal box was provided at Neopardy to break the section into smaller parts, that allowed a train to be sent forward from Crediton while another train was blocking the line at Yeoford. It is not known when it opened but it was before 1890. It was generally only in use Mondays to Saturdays during the daytime. In later years it was only brought into use on busy days such as summer weekends. It was closed completely on 7 April 1916.

Community railway 
The railway between Exeter and Barnstaple is designated as a community railway and is supported by marketing provided by the Devon and Cornwall Rail Partnership. The line is promoted as the Tarka Line.

References

External links

Railway stations in Devon
Railway stations in Great Britain opened in 1857
Former London and South Western Railway stations
Railway stations served by Great Western Railway
Railway request stops in Great Britain
DfT Category F2 stations